Balgha, also spelled balga, belgha, or belga, are heelless slippers made from leather. They are part of traditional dresses of the Maghreb region.

Balghas are worn by men and women of all social classes, both in urban and rural areas.

Sources 
 
 

Arab culture
Islamic culture
Arabic clothing
Cultural heritage of China
Chinese culture
Asian culture
African clothing
Folk footwear